Ayshe is a surname. Notable people with the surname include:

John Ayshe, English politician
Thomas Ayshe (died 1587), English politician

See also
Ashe (name)